Camp Fear may refer to:

 "Camp Fear" (Ben 10 episode), a season 2 episode of Ben 10
 "Camp Fear" (CSI episode), the 11th episode of the first season of CSI: Miami
 Camp Fear (Daria episode), the fourth episode of the fifth season of Daria
 Camp Fear (film), a 1991 horror film